Jiloan Mohammed Hamad Amin Alla Werdi (born 6 November 1990), known as Jiloan Hamad, is a professional footballer who plays as a winger for Saudi Arabian club Al-Kholood. Born in Azerbaijan and of Iraqi descent, Hamad moved to Sweden and represented their national team before switching to represent Iraq.

Early and personal life
Hamad was born in Azerbaijan, and is of Kurdish descent. His family originates from Ranya, Iraqi Kurdistan. They sought refugee status in both Turkmenistan and Russia before settling in Sweden in 1992, when Jiloan was two years old. Mohammed Hamad, Jiloan's father, was a guerrilla warrior in the Kurdish peshmerga for 15 years before fleeing Iraq together with his wife and children.

Club career

BK Forward
Having joined their youth setup aged 14–15, Hamad started his footballing career at the local club BK Forward in Örebro. He debuted in the senior team in 2006, aged 16, when the club competed in the Swedish third tier called Division 1. During the upcoming two seasons, he played 23 competitive games for the club, scoring 8 goals. During this period, he enjoyed a fruitful partnership with Jimmy Durmaz, his childhood friend who later would move on to play with him at Malmö FF. Before switching to the Scanian team he was refused by the local club Örebro SK, with the club citing that Hamad "was too short".

Malmö FF

Hamad came to Malmö FF from BK Forward in December 2007. He made his Allsvenskan debut on 17 September 2008 in a 0–4-loss against IF Elfsborg. After only having played one match for the club in 2008, Hamad had a breakthrough in 2009 when he played 20 matches and scored two goals. In 2010, he battled with teammate Jimmy Durmaz for the position as left midfielder. Hamad ended up playing 27 games although only starting in 10, the majority of which were played as right midfielder. In the final game of 2010, he scored the game-winning goal against Mjällby AIF that secured the title, the day after his 20th birthday.

Hamad started the 2011 season with injury problems and missed the start of the season. He recovered and became the natural choice for playing right midfielder after team-mate Guillermo Molins was sold in the summer transfer window of 2011. Hamad also participated in the club's campaign to qualify for the 2011–12 UEFA Champions League and scored the goal that took the club through to the play-off round after equalizing at home against Rangers. He continued to play in Europe as the club qualified for the group stage of the 2011–12 UEFA Europa League after losing in the play-off round of the Champions League. During the 2011 season Hamad signed a new contract to the end of the 2013 season.

Hamad played all of Malmö FF's 30 league matches during the 2012 season. He also scored six goals which was his best goal production since joining the club. Hamad was also given the captaincy for the majority of the team's matches. Former captain Daniel Andersson had stepped down to focus on coaching duties before the beginning of the season and new captain Ulrich Vinzents received limited time on the pitch.

The 2013 season was Hamad's first and only season as full-time captain for the club. In total he played 28 matches and scored eight goals in the league. He also played all matches for the club during the qualification stage for the 2013–14 UEFA Europa League and scored two goals. Some of his goals in the early part of the season was match-deciding, on 14 April 2013 he scored the only goal of the game in the home fixture against Kalmar FF, one week later he made the same accomplishment in the away fixture against AIK. Malmö FF secured the title one round before the competition of the league and Hamad could raise Lennart Johanssons Pokal on 3 November 2013 after a last home win against Syrianska FC. His last match for the club was the 2013 Svenska Supercupen against IFK Göteborg which Malmö FF won 3–2. For his performances in the 2013 Allsvenskan season he won midfielder of the year and was also nominated for most valuable player of the year.

1899 Hoffenheim
On 30 October 2013, Bundesliga club 1899 Hoffenheim confirmed the free transfer of Jiloan Hamad to the club with a contract until 2017. The transfer went through on 1 January 2014 when the German transfer window opened. During the same spring he played 8 competitive games for his new side.

After attracting a serious injury during his loan spell at Standard Liège in 2015, he made his comeback for Hoffenheim in a Bundesliga fixture against Bayer Leverkusen on 23 January 2016, in which he scored the first goal in a 1–1 draw.

Standard Liège
In late January 2015, he was loaned to Belgian first tier side Standard Liège for the remainder of the 2014–2015 season. He played 6 competitive games for the side, scoring once, before injuring his knee in late March 2015, effectively ending his season.

Hammarby IF
He returned to his native country on 7 February 2017, signing a two-year deal (with an option for a further) with the Stockholm-based side Hammarby IF. Hamad scored two goals in three games as Hammarby got knocked out in the group stage of the 2016–17 Svenska Cupen. On 3 April, the first match day of Allsvenskan 2017, he contributed with an assist to Rômulo's 2–1-goal in an away loss against IFK Norrköping. He scored a brace for his side in a 2–1 away win against Halmstad on 14 May. Hamad scored his first home goal at Tele2 Arena on 13 August 2017, from the penalty spot in a 2–2 draw against Östersund.

Incheon United
On 29 January 2019, Hamad signed with Incheon United in the K League 1. On 23 July 2019 Jiloan Hamad parted ways with Incheon by mutual consent.

Al-Kholood
On 31 January 2023, Hamad joined Saudi First Division League side Al-Kholood.

International career
Having been born in Azerbaijan, Hamad was able to represent both Iraq, Azerbaijan and Sweden.

Sweden

Under-21
Hamad was a member and also for some time the captain of the Sweden U21 national side. On 7 September 2010, Hamad scored a last-minute goal for the 1–0 away win against Bulgaria U21 in a 2011 UEFA Euro U-21 Championship qualifier. In early 2011, Hamad revealed that he had rejected an offer from Azerbaijan coach Berti Vogts to play for his country of birth.

Senior
Hamad was first with the Sweden squad for the 2011 January training tour and played his first cap for Sweden during this tour. His first cap for Sweden was against Botswana on 19 January 2011. Hamad was once again selected for the annual training camp for the Sweden national team in January 2012. The squad selection for the camp traditionally features the best Swedish players in domestic and other Scandinavian leagues. He was selected for the friendly against England on 14 November, but did not get any playing time, and was then again selected for the winter tour in 2013.

After a five year absence, Hamad was called up to the Swedish squad for the training tour in January 2018. He made his return on the pitch in a 1–1 draw against Estonia, where several pundits praised Hamad's performance and voted him as the best player on the pitch.

Iraq
Hamad was reported to be called up by Iraq in October 2018 though he declined to comment. He was not called into Sweden's squad in December 2018. On 26 February 2019, Hamad announced that he would represent the Iraq national team and "help the team reach new heights" from February 2019 and onward.

Career statistics

Club

International

Honours 
Malmö FF
Allsvenskan: 2010, 2013
Svenska Supercupen: 2013

Individual
Allsvenskan midfielder of the year: 2013

See also
 List of Iraq international footballers

References

External links

 Malmö FF profile 
 Jiloan Hamad at Swedish Football Association 
 
 

Living people
1990 births
Footballers from Baku
Iraqi footballers
Swedish footballers
Association football wingers
Iraq international footballers
Sweden youth international footballers
Sweden under-21 international footballers
Sweden international footballers
Swedish people of Iraqi descent
Swedish people of Kurdish descent
BK Forward players
Malmö FF players
TSG 1899 Hoffenheim players
Standard Liège players
Hammarby Fotboll players
Incheon United FC players
HNK Gorica players
Örebro SK players
Al-Kholood Club players
Allsvenskan players
Bundesliga players
K League 1 players
Belgian Pro League players
Croatian Football League players
Superettan players
Saudi First Division League players
Kurdish sportspeople
Swedish expatriate footballers
Iraqi expatriate footballers
Swedish expatriate sportspeople in Germany
Expatriate footballers in Germany
Swedish expatriate sportspeople in Belgium
Expatriate footballers in Belgium
Iraqi expatriate sportspeople in Croatia
Expatriate footballers in Croatia
Iraqi expatriate sportspeople in Saudi Arabia
Expatriate footballers in Saudi Arabia
Dual internationalists (football)